The  New York Giants season was the franchise's 92nd season in the National Football League (NFL), their seventh season playing their home games at MetLife Stadium in East Rutherford, New Jersey, and the first under head coach Ben McAdoo.

After losing 6 games where they had late 4th quarter leads in 2015, Jerry Reese spent over $200 million in free agency to revitalize their defense. He re-signed Jason Pierre-Paul to a one-year deal and signed Damon Harrison, Olivier Vernon and Janoris Jenkins. Cornerback Eli Apple was drafted with the 10th overall pick in the 2016 NFL Draft.

The Giants began 2–0 before falling into a three-game losing streak to the Redskins, Vikings and Packers. The Giants rebounded and went on a six-game winning streak for the first time since 2010, before falling to the Pittsburgh Steelers in Week 13. The Giants then upset the 11–1 Dallas Cowboys in Week 14 to improve to 9–4. With their Week 14 win over the Dallas Cowboys, the Giants clinched a winning season for the first time since 2012 and also swept the Cowboys for the first time since 2011. The Giants got their 10th win of the season in Week 15, having a 10 win season for the first time since 2010. Their 7–1 record at home is their best home record since MetLife Stadium opened in 2010.

Despite losing to the Philadelphia Eagles in Week 16, the Tampa Bay Buccaneers' loss to the New Orleans Saints two days later meant the Giants clinched a playoff trip for the first time since their last Super Bowl season in 2011.

The Giants' first playoff game since Super Bowl XLVI ended in disappointment, as they were upended by the Green Bay Packers in the Wild Card round at Lambeau Field. The Giants only managed to score 13 points and allowed a season high 38 points, ending their season. Until 2022, this was the last season in which the Giants would have a winning season or postseason appearance. 

The Giants sent four players to the Pro Bowl and their defense in 2016 was ranked third in the NFL with five All-Pros (the other All-Pro was Odell Beckham Jr.).

Offseason

Free agents signed

Draft

Note
 The Giants conditionally traded their seventh-round selection to the Pittsburgh Steelers in exchange for punter Brad Wing.

Staff

Final roster

Schedule

Preseason

Regular season

Note: Intra-division opponents are in bold text.

Postseason

Game summaries

Regular season

Week 1: at Dallas Cowboys

Victor Cruz played his first NFL game in 700 days and the Giants fought hard with rookies Dak Prescott and Ezekiel Elliott in their pro debuts. The Cowboys could only muster 3 field goals in the first half as a Dez Bryant touchdown catch was overturned after review. Giants rookie wide receiver Sterling Shepard caught his first career touchdown pass from Eli Manning giving the Giants a 13-9 halftime lead. Cruz had 4 catches for 34 yards and the game-winning touchdown with 6 minutes to play. On the last play of the game, Cowboys wide receiver Terrance Williams caught a pass that put Dallas near field goal range but chose to stay in bounds to get extra yards. The clock ran out before Prescott could get another play, and the Giants started 1–0 for the first time since 2010.

The Giants snapped a three game losing streak in Dallas and Ben McAdoo won his first game as an NFL coach.

Week 2: vs. New Orleans Saints

All the fans and media expected another shootout like the 52-49 game the year earlier, but oddly enough, the game was very low scoring as neither offense could capitalize on their opportunities. The Giants led 7-3 at halftime, their only score coming from a field goal blocked by Johnathan Hankins which Janoris Jenkins returned for a touchdown.

Despite a key fumble earlier in the game, the Giants drove down the field and Victor Cruz made the game's decisive catch at the Saints 2-yard line in the final minutes. Josh Brown kicked the game-winning field goal and the Giants improved to 2–0 for the first time since 2009. Eli Manning had 368 passing yards in the win.

Week 3: vs. Washington Redskins

This was a highly anticipated game after the Redskins added Josh Norman and would be the first time facing Odell Beckham Jr. since their incident the prior season. After Eli Manning threw an interception early in the fourth quarter, Beckham was seen striking the kicking net in frustration. The Redskins, who were 0–2 this season, picked off Manning again at the last second to seal a 29–27 Washington victory, which stunned MetLife Stadium. This was the only home loss the Giants suffered in the 2016 season.

Center Weston Richburg was ejected in the loss for pushing Norman in the 4th quarter, which proved costly.

Week 4: at Minnesota Vikings

The Giants lost in Minnesota for the second time in as many seasons and their offense was even more anemic in this contest. Odell Beckham Jr.'s frustrations continued as he was held to 3 receptions for 23 yards.

Week 5: at Green Bay Packers

This was the first time the Giants returned to Lambeau Field since their victory over the Packers in the Divisional Round of the 2011 Playoffs. The Packers offense dominated the time of possession but Janoris Jenkins had two interceptions on Aaron Rodgers and he made several other key plays keeping the struggling Giants offense in the game. Eli Manning was held in check with one touchdown late in the 4th quarter and 199 yards, and the Giants running backs were only able to rush for 43 yards in 15 attempts. At this point in the season, the Giants offense ranked 27th in total scoring.

Week 6: vs. Baltimore Ravens

Hoping to stop a three-game losing streak, the Giants hosted the Baltimore Ravens in a rematch of their 33–14 loss in 2012. Eli Manning threw his 300th career touchdown to Roger Lewis late in the second quarter. The Giants offense found their footing in the third quarter and their defense had a goal line stand to start the 4th quarter. Late in the 4th quarter, the Ravens drove down the field and scored making the game 23–20. Eli Manning and the Giants responded with a 66-yard touchdown pass to Odell Beckham Jr. - his second touchdown of the game (both from 65+ yards) to make the score 27–23. The Ravens threw up a Hail Mary but was stopped and the Giants ended their three-game losing streak. The Giants improved to 3–3 and became the third NFL team to win 700 games (including postseason). This game started a six-game winning streak for the Giants that would last until Week 13.

Week 7: at Los Angeles Rams
NFL International Series

The Giants played in London for the first time since their 2007 win against the Miami Dolphins. Larry Donnell fumbled on the first play from scrimmage and the Rams scored 10 quick points only to be shut out by a dominant Giants defense. Landon Collins broke out recording two interceptions, one for a touchdown which many analysts hailed as the play of the year. Dominique Rodgers-Cromartie also recorded two more interceptions, including the game-winner. The defensive front also recorded three sacks. Running back Rashad Jennings capped off a touchdown drive with a 1-yard run and the Giants won 17-10, improving to 4-3 with a Bye Week ahead.

Week 9: vs. Philadelphia Eagles

The Giants quickly took a 14-point lead after rookie Carson Wentz threw two interceptions on his first two drives and Eli Manning capitalized with touchdown passes to Odell Beckham Jr. and Roger Lewis. The Eagles left 9 points off the board in the first half, being stopped on 4th down in field goal range twice and having a field goal attempt blocked. The Eagles hung on and had a chance to take the lead late, but the defense hung on the Giants improved to 5–3 and beat the Eagles at MetLife for the first time since 2012.

This was the 14th and final time Eli Manning threw four touchdown passes in a game.

Week 10: vs. Cincinnati Bengals

After their win over the Eagles, the Giants stayed at home for a Monday night matchup against the Cincinnati Bengals, who were coming back from London after their tie against the Redskins. Tom Coughlin, Justin Tuck, and Ernie Accorsi were inducted into the Giants Ring of Honor at halftime nursing a 14-10 lead. The Bengals quickly got 10 points and had a 6-point lead going into the 4th quarter. Sterling Shepard caught a touchdown on 4th and Goal to give the Giants a 21-20 lead. Their defense led by their vaunted pass rush took over and the offense successfully ran out the clock. The Giants improved to 6–3 and matched their win total from the previous two years.

Week 11: vs. Chicago Bears

The Giants stayed at home for a matchup against the Chicago Bears. The Bears took a 16–9 lead at halftime. Manning threw two touchdown passes to open the second half and their defense shut out the Bears for the rest of the game. Jay Cutler threw a late interception to Landon Collins - his final pass as a Chicago Bear - to seal the win. The Giants 7-3 start was their best 10 game start since starting 9-1 in 2008. The win also ensured the Giants improved from their 6–10 campaigns from the last two years, and extended their winning streak to five consecutive games, their longest since 2010.

Week 12: at Cleveland Browns

The Giants played a conservative game and their defense recorded a season-high six sacks in their win over the Browns, their sixth in a row. Eli Manning threw three touchdowns, two caught by Odell Beckham Jr. and Jason Pierre-Paul also had a touchdown on defense. This loss dropped the Browns to 0–12. The Giants also had their first six-game winning streak since 2008.

Week 13: at Pittsburgh Steelers

Trying to win their seventh game in a row, the Giants travelled to Pittsburgh to take on the Steelers' Killer B's (Ben Roethlisberger, Le'Veon Bell and Antonio Brown) who made an impact in the game. The Steelers defense was in Eli Manning's face all game, forcing two interceptions. The Giants lost 24–14, with a touchdown in garbage time, and snapped their 6-game winning streak. Rookie Eli Apple was a bright spot for the Giants, recording both his first career fumble recovery and interception in the 3rd quarter.

Week 14: vs. Dallas Cowboys

The Cowboys won 11 games in a row since losing to the Giants in Week 1 and had clinched a playoff berth the week before. Meanwhile. the Giants were shorthanded after losing Jason Pierre-Paul to injury. On Sunday Night Football, the defenses showed out, both allowing 260 total yards, forcing three takeaways, and each recording three sacks. After allowing Terrance Williams to get wide open for a touchdown in the first quarter, the Giants defense did not allow a single point for the rest of the game. Dak Prescott was picked off by Janoris Jenkins in the first half while the Cowboys defense forced two Eli Manning fumbles of their own. Trailing 7-3 in the third quarter, Leon Hall intercepted Prescott and Manning threw a 61-yard touchdown pass to Odell Beckham Jr. two plays later, which would be the game-winner. Jenkins forced a Dez Bryant fumble on his only catch of the game, thwarting a Cowboys 4th quarter rally. With the 10-7 win, the Giants improved to 9–4 and clinched a winning season for the first time since 2012. The Giants also swept the Cowboys for the first time since their 2011 Super Bowl-winning season.

Ezekiel Elliott rushed for 107 yards for the Cowboys despite the loss.

Week 15: vs. Detroit Lions

Sterling Shepard scored a touchdown on the opening drive but the offense wasn't able to do much afterwards. Their defense played outstanding and forced two red zone turnovers. While leading 10-6 in the 4th quarter, Odell Beckham Jr. had a signature one-handed touchdown catch in the 4th quarter and an interception by Dominique Rodgers-Cromartie sealed the 17-6 victory. The 10-4 Giants were in the drivers seat to clinch their first playoff berth in 5 years.

Week 16: at Philadelphia Eagles

The Giants were down 14-0 early after Manning threw a pick six to Malcolm Jenkins. The offense got going, but failed to convert on their scoring opportunities. Four Robbie Gould field goals weren't enough, and the Giants fell to the Eagles 24–19, dropping them to 10–5. The loss clinched the NFC East and home field advantage for the Dallas Cowboys.

Despite the loss, the Giants clinched a playoff berth when the Tampa Bay Buccaneers fell to the New Orleans Saints 31–24 two days later. Ben McAdoo became the fifth Giants head coach to clinch a playoff berth in his first season, and the first since Jim Fassel in 1997.

Week 17: at Washington Redskins

Having been locked into the 5 seed, the media questioned whether the Giants would rest their starters against the Redskins who were fighting for their playoff lives. They did not. After struggling to move the ball all game, the Redskins broke through the Giants defense in the second half, tying the game at 10. On a late drive in the 4th quarter, Eli Manning connected with Tavarres King for 44 yards which set up a Josh Brown field goal. When the Redskins got the ball back, Kirk Cousins was intercepted by Dominique Rodgers-Cromartie. They used their timeouts to get the ball back for one last chance, but Trevin Wade recovered the lateral and scored for the Giants, winning 19-10. 

The Redskins were eliminated with the loss, and the Giants won 11 games for the first time since 2008. The Giants were set to play the Green Bay Packers at Lambeau Field after they defeated the Detroit Lions later that night to win the NFC North title.

Postseason

NFC Wild Card Playoffs: at #4 Green Bay Packers

Standings

Division

Conference

References

External links

New York Giants
New York Giants seasons
New York Giants season
21st century in East Rutherford, New Jersey
Meadowlands Sports Complex